Giulio Ramponi (8 January 1902 – December 1986) was an Italian automobile technician and racing driver.

He was born in Milan where he worked for the Florentia car maker and the Pelizzola maker of fuel pumps. In 1918  he became the mechanic of his stepfathers friend, opera singer Giuseppe Campari (1892–1933) who won at Mugello in 1920 with Alfa Romeo.  In 1924, Ramponi became chief riding mechanic and co-driver for Antonio Ascari (1888–1925) and his Alfa Romeo P2, in which Ascari was killed in 1925. Ramponi was not in the car, since a GP rule change in 1925 eliminated the use of riding mechanics. Ascari died in his arms.

Working under Vittorio Jano (1891–1965), he was test driver for Alfa Romeo 6C in 1927, and again, chief mechanic and co-driver for Campari.  They won Mille Miglia in 1928 and 1929. He also raced in England, winning the 1928 Brooklands 6-hour race. Since losing his job in 1929, he worked for Tim Birkin (1896–1933) and the Dorothy Paget team.  In 1932 he was again at Alfa for the Alfa Romeo P3 project. On 10 September 1933 Giuseppe Campari was killed, at the same time causing Baconin Borzacchini to fatally crash.

In 1934 he became team leader with Whitney Straight (1912–79) and they won the First South African Grand Prix. Since 1935 he worked for Dick Seaman (1913–39). Ramponi also became a British citizen in the 1930s. During World War II  he was interred on the Isle of Man and his first wife died from peritonitis.  In 1947 he married Irene Cooper. He worked for 20 years as a consultant to various automobile and aircraft companies.

Ramponi had first visited South-Africa in 1934. Since 1968 he and his wife Irene lived in South Africa.

References

Italian automotive engineers
Racing drivers from Milan
Alfa Romeo people
Italian emigrants to the United Kingdom
1902 births
1986 deaths
Engineers from Milan
Naturalised citizens of the United Kingdom